Oneroa is the largest village on Mangaia, one of the Cook Islands. It is located in  the west of the island, in the district of Kei'a, and contains over half of the island's population. Oneroa is a contiguous village area that consists of three villages, Tavaʻenga, Kaumata and Temakatea.

References

Populated places in the Cook Islands
Mangaia